Polyvinyl alcohol dehydrogenase (cytochrome) (PVA dehydrogenase, PVADH) is an enzyme with systematic name polyvinyl alcohol:ferricytochrome-c oxidoreductase. This enzyme catalyses the following chemical reaction

 polyvinyl alcohol + ferricytochrome c  oxidized polyvinyl alcohol + ferrocytochrome c + H+

This enzyme participates in bacterial polyvinyl alcohol degradation.

References

External links 
 

EC 1.1.2